Robert Pennywell (November 6, 1954 – October 7, 2022) was an American football player who played linebacker for four seasons for the NFL's Atlanta Falcons, and two seasons for the Michigan Panthers of the USFL.

Pennywell died on October 7, 2022, at the age of 67.

References

1954 births
2022 deaths
20th-century African-American sportspeople
African-American players of American football
American football linebackers
Atlanta Falcons players
Grambling State Tigers football players
Players of American football from Shreveport, Louisiana